The Extreme Sailing Series (ESS) (formerly the iShares Cup) was an annual global racing series, organised by OC Sport, which ran from 2007 to 2018.

The series started in 2007 with its main attraction being the stadium racing which puts the race course inside a stadium environment for the ease of spectators' viewing.

Many of the sailors taking part in the series were around-the-world yachtsmen, Olympic medallists, America's Cup sailors, World and European champions and even world record holders.

The series was terminated in 2019 after the event became financially nonviable and OC Sport were unable to secure a management buy-out.

Results 

Based on results from 2007–2018, Pete Greenhalgh (GBR) is the most successful sailor from the series, consistently finishing on the podium, including 1st place in 2007 on Basilica, alongside his younger brother, Robert Greenhalgh.

References

External links